KZMK (100.9 FM) is a radio station broadcasting a contemporary hit radio format. Licensed to Sierra Vista, Arizona, United States, it serves southwestern Cochise County, Arizona.  The station is currently owned by CCR-Sierra Vista IV, LLC (Cherry Creek Media).

History
This station first went on the air on September 9, 1973 using the call letters KTAN-FM, and it broadcast a top 40 rock and roll format. It was the sister station of KTAN AM and the first FM station in southern Cochise County. KTAN-AM-FM was owned by Ken Ferguson (Huachuca Broadcasting). Ken Ferguson died in a plane crash in 1977 and the station was sold, changing its callsign to KTAZ-FM to coincide with its use of Z-Rock as its music service. In 1989, under GCS Broadcasting, the call letters were changed to KFFN. The current call letters of KZMK were adopted in 1993 after the owners purchased a rival FM station that was using the call letters KZMK. That station is now KWCD.

KZMK was sold to DB Broadcasting in 1995, Commonwealth Broadcasting in 2000, and Cherry Creek Media in 2003.

References

External links

FCC History Cards for KZMK

ZMK
Radio stations established in 1979
1979 establishments in Arizona
Contemporary hit radio stations in the United States